Douglas McIntyre may refer to:

 Douglas McIntyre (Homosexuals Anonymous), National Director of Homosexuals Anonymous
 Douglas McIntyre (politician), Douglas Carmichael "Mike" McIntyre II, politician
 Doug McIntyre, Douglas McIntyre  US Radio Show Host, Radio and Television Producer, Writer